Alfred John Matthews (1938-1997), was a male boxer who competed for England. He fought as Alf Matthews.

Boxing career
He represented England in the 75 kg middleweight division at the 1962 British Empire and Commonwealth Games in Perth, Western Australia.

He was a member of the Litherland Amateur Boxing Club and was twice ABA middleweight champion in 1962 and 1963.

He made his professional debut on 11 June 1963 and fought in 13 fights until 1965.

References

1938 births
1997 deaths
English male boxers
Boxers at the 1962 British Empire and Commonwealth Games
Middleweight boxers
Commonwealth Games competitors for England